Zalaszentgrót is a district in north-eastern part of Zala County. Zalaszentgrót is also the name of the town where the district seat is found. The district is located in the Western Transdanubia Statistical Region.

Geography 
Zalaszentgrót District borders with Sárvár District (Vas County) to the north, Sümeg District (Veszprém County) to the northeast, Keszthely District to the southeast, Zalaegerszeg District to the southwest, Vasvár District (Vas County) to the west. The number of the inhabited places in Zalaszentgrót District is 20.

Municipalities 
The district has 1 town and 19 villages.
(ordered by population, as of 1 January 2013)

The bolded municipality is city.

See also
List of cities and towns in Hungary

References

External links
 Postal codes of the Zalaszentgrót District

Districts in Zala County